Stesilea is a genus of longhorn beetles of the subfamily Lamiinae, containing the following species:

 Stesilea borneotica Breuning & de Jong, 1941
 Stesilea celebensis Breuning, 1962
 Stesilea gracilis Breuning, 1938
 Stesilea inornata Pascoe, 1865
 Stesilea laevifrons Breunig, 1943
 Stesilea prolata Pascoe, 1865
 Stesilea truncata Breuning, 1962

incertae sedis
 Stesilea tuberculata Nonfried, 1894

References

Pteropliini